Chusquea delicatula is a South American bamboo found in the Andean mountains of Peru including the areas around Machu Picchu. It's a highly arching bamboo, so much so that its culms are thin and viney, and its tips often touch the ground. The branching from the nodes of its culms shoot out in all directions in a star-like formation. Mature height for the bamboo is around 3 meters length.

References
Clayton, W.D., Harman, K.T. and Williamson, H. (2002 onwards). World Grass Species: Descriptions, Identification, and Information Retrieval. . Retrieved 1 August 2005; 15:30 GMT

External links
American Bamboo Society
American Bamboo Society : species table

delicatula
Endemic flora of Peru
Flora of the Andes
Grasses of South America
Plants described in 1927